The Pine Grove Iron Works was a southcentral Pennsylvania smelting facility during the Industrial Revolution.  The works is notable for remaining structures that are historical visitor attractions of Pine Grove Furnace State Park, including the furnace stack of the Pine Grove Furnace. The site was listed on the National Register of Historic Places on April 13, 1977 for its significance in architecture and industry. It includes seven contributing buildings, two structures, fourteen sites, and two objects.

Geography
The works occupied the small area around the furnace stack a "quarter of a mile from the" quarry.  Notable geographic points near the works include the Mountain Creek distributary point for the furnace water race on the west, the wash race distributary point from Tom's Run (north), and the confluence of the furnace's water race with the creek (east).  Also to the east and southeast were the railroad bridge over the creek and the "east workings" with the limestone quarry ("flux ... pit 250'x75'x50' deep" in 1891) and Pine Grove bank No. 1.

Pine Grove
Pine Grove was the village/town associated with the iron works (designated the "Pine Grove Furnace" populated place in 1979), and village structures included the Methodist Episcopal Church and residences north of the east-west road through the area.  By 1886 the village had a post office, and the schoolhouse and  Pine Grove Cemetery were south of the village and the iron works.  A local store provide goods.

History
Pine Grove Furnace was built about 1770, the second of nine Cumberland County furnaces. It was built and operated by Robert Thornburg and John Arthur, in the interest of George Stevenson, who already owned Laurel Forge downstream on Mountain Creek. The furnace smelted iron ore to produce colonial cast iron products such as wagon wheel iron, fireplace backs, iron kettles, ten plate stoves, and in the late 19th century, Baldwin Locomotive parts.

The Pine Grove Furnace facilities were identified as "Pine Grove Iron-Works" by 1782 ("Mr.  iron-works" in 1783), and in addition to water raceways and charcoal hearths (traces of which are still visible), support facilities were built near the works, e.g., the 1829 L-shaped iron master mansion  (named "office" in 1872).  A saw mill was built , and the Pine Grove No. 1 bank was used for limonite iron ore while two quarries provided limestone.  The 1870 South Mountain RR, with offices at Pine Grove, connected the furnace to limestone pits and three operating ore mines. 

The charcoal-fired furnace was deactivated in 1874, and the engine house(s) continued pumping the ore pit (now Fuller Lake) to keep reduced water levels. The cold blast furnace had been converted to hot blast by 1877, and remodelling in the 1877-8 winter including changes to allow alternate fuels. Connellsville coke was first used on March 22/23, 1879; and anthracite was first used shortly afterward. A rail extension to the Wild Cat pits, 2.5 miles west of Pine Grove, was considered in 1880 but not completed. The SMRR-succeeding 1891 Hunter's Run and Slate Belt Railroad and 1910 Gettysburg and Harrisburg Railway operated to the Pine Grove Railroad Station and the nearby Pine Grove Park.

Iron production ended in 1895, and the Pine Grove Iron Works was sold on September 12, 1913, as part of 3 tracts which became the majority of the Pine Grove Division of the South Mountain Forest and, by 1931, the Pine Grove Furnace State Park.

The ownership chain of the Pine Grove Iron Works was published in 1886, and a history by one of the superintendents was published in 1934.  The Ironmaster's Mansion was restored by 1985 and renovated from 2010 until April 5, 2011.  In 1991, Railroads to Pine Grove Furnace was published.

References

External links
  ( Internet Archive version)

Ironworks and steel mills in Pennsylvania
Blast furnaces in the United States
Buildings and structures in Cumberland County, Pennsylvania
History of Cumberland County, Pennsylvania
Industrial buildings and structures on the National Register of Historic Places in Pennsylvania
National Register of Historic Places in Cumberland County, Pennsylvania
Companies established in 1764 
1764 establishments in Pennsylvania
South Mountain Range (Maryland−Pennsylvania)
Tourist attractions in Cumberland County, Pennsylvania
1764 establishments in the Thirteen Colonies
Colonization history of the United States
European colonization of North America
History of the Thirteen Colonies
Province of Pennsylvania
Foundries in the United States